Alucita pluvialis is a moth of the family Alucitidae. It is found in India (Assam).

References

Moths described in 1907
Alucitidae
Moths of Asia
Taxa named by Edward Meyrick